The Duchy of Ksani was an administrative unit in feudal Georgia. It consisted lands around Ksani and two more neighbouring south-western valleys, thus making two administrative entities: Ksniskhevi, with its centre in Kvenipnevi and Tskhradzmiskhevi with its centre in Largvisi, which is also home of the Largvisi Monastery.

History 

Tskhradzmiskhevi started to become dominant in the 10th century when it included gorges of Lekhura, Medjuda and upper side of the river Liakhvi. After incorporating of neighbouring southern gorges, the residence was relocated from Largvisi to Kvenipnevi.

According to Vakhushti's references, during the reign of Tamar the Great, Kartli and Ksani were separated Dukedoms. After the Mongol invasion in the second half of the 13th century, the dukes of Ksani were of the Bibiluri family.

In the 14th century, Saeristavo included: Tskhradzma, Jamuri, Kharchokhi, Jurta, Kholoti, Isroliskhevi, Abazasdzeta, Truso, Ghuda, Gagasdzeni, Mleta, Arakhveti, Khando, Khanchaeti, Dzagnakora, Dighuami, Gavasi, Atseriskhevi, Bekhushe.

In the 15th century, the Saeristavo practically became a Satavado ("manorial").

Dukes of Ksani
 Largvel Kvenipneveli
 Shalva I Kvenipneveli, son of Duke Largvel
 Virshel Kvenipneveli, son of Duke Shalva I
 Shalva II Kvenipneveli, Duke 1460—1470
 Elizbar Kvenipneveli
 Iese I Kvenipneveli, Duke 1624—1635
 Iese II Kvenipneveli, Duke 1635—1642
 Shanshe I Kvenipneveli, Duke 1642—1653
 Shalva Kvenipneveli, Duke 1653—1661
 Iese III Kvenipneveli, Duke 1661—1675
 David Kvenipneveli, Duke 1675—1717
 Shanshe, Duke of the Ksani, 1717—1753
 Prince Iulon of Georgia, 1790–1801.

References 

 GSE, (1986) volume 10, page 683, Tbilisi.
 Gvasalia, J. (1973) Essays on Georgian history. volume 4. Tbilisi

Former duchies of Georgia (country)
States and territories established in the 15th century
States and territories disestablished in 1777